Sloan is a Scottish and Irish surname. Notable people with the surname include:

 A. Scott Sloan (1820–1895), American lawyer
 Alfred P. Sloan (1875–1966), the long-time president and chairman of General Motors
 Bridget Sloan (born 1992), American artistic gymnast, 2008 Olympic Silver medalist and NCAA Champion
 Derek Sloan (born 1984), Canadian politician
 Dulcé Sloan, American comedian, actress, and writer 
 Ed Sloan (born 1973), American musician, member of the band Crossfade
 Helen Farr Sloan (1911–2005), artist, educator, and patron of the arts
 Hugh W. Sloan, Jr. (born 1940), American political aide, treasurer of Richard Nixon's 1972 campaign committee
 Harry E. Sloan (born 1950), American SPAC founder; former chairman of MGM and SBS Broadcasting
 Ian Sloan (field hockey)
 Ian Sloan (born 1938), Australian mathematician
 Ithamar Sloan (1822–1898), American lawyer
 Jerry Sloan (1942–2020), American basketball player and coach, most famous for his long tenure as coach of the Utah Jazz
 Jessica Sloan (born 1982), Canadian paralympic swimmer
 Jill S. Barnholtz-Sloan, American biostatistician and data scientist
 John French Sloan (1871–1951), American painter
 Judith Sloan (born 1954), Australian economist and business journalist
 Kim Sloan, Canadian art historian
 Melanie Sloan (born 1965), Executive Director of Citizens for Responsibility and Ethics in Washington
 Norm Sloan (1926–2003), American basketball coach
 P. F. Sloan (1945–2015), American songwriter and musician
 Paddy Sloan (1921–1993), Ireland international footballer and coach
 Richard Elihu Sloan (1857–1933), American politician, Governor of Arizona Territory (1909–1912)
 Steve Sloan (born 1944), American football coach
 Stewart Sloan, Scottish-born Hong Kong author
 Timothy J. Sloan (born 1960/61), American banker, CEO of Wells Fargo
 Tod Sloan (disambiguation), multiple people
 Tommy Sloan (1925–2010), Scottish footballer
 Victor Sloan (born 1945), Irish visual artist
 William Gibson Sloan (1838–1914), Scottish evangelist to the Faroe Islands

Fictional characters
 Luther Sloan, a character in Star Trek
 Inspector C. D. "Seedy" Sloan, a character in the Sloan and Crosby novels
 Mark Sloan (Grey's Anatomy), a character in the TV series Grey's Anatomy
 Dr. Mark Sloan, the protagonist of the TV series Diagnosis: Murder
 Police Detective/Lieutenant Steve Sloan, son of Mark Sloan in the TV series Diagnosis: Murder
 Matron Margaret "Maggie" Sloan, a character in the TV series A Country Practice
 Walker Sloan, an antagonist in the video game Spider-Man: Edge of Time

Surnames of Irish origin
Scottish surnames
Surnames of Scottish origin
Anglicised Irish-language surnames